São Sebastião do Uatumã is a municipality located in the Brazilian state of Amazonas. Its population was 14,352 (2020) and its area is 10,741 km2.

Conservation

The municipality contains part of the  Uatumã Biological Reserve, a strictly protected conservation unit created in 2002.
It contains about 60% of the  Uatumã Sustainable Development Reserve, which protects the lower part of the Uatumã River basin.

References

Municipalities in Amazonas (Brazilian state)